Orland Fenwick (1822 – 9 December 1897) was Mayor of Melbourne from 1871–1872, after having joined the council in 1865. Born in Gravesend, Kent in England, Fenwick immigrated to Victoria in November 1852, where he ran a retail and wholesale drapery business. Following his term as mayor, he remained on the city council until his death.

References

Mayors and Lord Mayors of Melbourne
1822 births
1897 deaths
People from Gravesend, Kent
English emigrants to Australia
Victoria (Australia) local councillors
19th-century Australian politicians